Tully Gorge is a national park in Queensland, Australia, 1,338 km northwest of Brisbane.  The park forms part of the Wooroonooran Important Bird Area, identified as such by BirdLife International because it supports populations of a range of bird species endemic to Queensland's Wet Tropics.

Waterfalls 
Follow Tully Falls Road to the Tully Gorge Lookout. Tully Falls only run in a big wet season, but the walls of rock and rainforest which plunge 300 m (984 feet) down to the Tully River are still an awe-inspiring sight. An 800 m track takes walkers to the Tully River above the falls. Tully Falls Road begins on the outskirts of Ravenshoe at the junction of the Mount Garnet Road. The Tully Gorge National Park turnoff is 24 km down the road. A 1 km gravel road leads to a carpark and viewing platform.

See also

 Protected areas of Queensland

References

National parks of Far North Queensland
Protected areas established in 1923
Important Bird Areas of Queensland
1923 establishments in Australia